The Dhaula Kuan Metro Station is located on the Delhi Airport Express Line of the Delhi Metro. This station is the only elevated one along the Airport Express Line and features check-in facilities. It did not commence operations along with the rest of the line and trains ran through the station without stopping initially.  It was opened to the public for the first time on Independence Day, 15 August 2011.

Under the Phase III network, the Durgabai Deshmukh South Campus metro station was built. A 1.2 km skywalk linking the two stations was   open to public on 9 February 2019. The footover bridge has a record 22 travellators for hassle-free commuting.

Station layout

Entry/Exit

See also
List of Delhi Metro stations
Transport in Delhi
Delhi Metro Rail Corporation
Delhi Suburban Railway

References

External links

 Delhi Metro Rail Corporation Ltd. (Official site) 
 Delhi Metro Annual Reports
 
 UrbanRail.Net – descriptions of all metro systems in the world, each with a schematic map showing all stations.

Delhi Metro stations
Railway stations in India opened in 2011
Railway stations in South West Delhi district